The Bundesvision Song Contest 2010 was the sixth edition of the annual Bundesvision Song Contest musical event. The contest was held on 1 October 2010 at the Max-Schmeling-Halle, Berlin, following Peter Fox's win in the 2009 contest in Brandenburg with the song "Schwarz zu blau". This was the second time that Berlin had hosted the contest, after previously hosting in 2007. The contest was hosted by Stefan Raab, Johanna Klum, and Elton in the green room.

The participants were announced online on the TV total website on 31 May 2010, the Monday after the Eurovision Song Contest 2010 in which Germany had won with help from Stefan Raab's involvement in their national selection, Unser Star für Oslo.

The winner of the Bundesvision Song Contest 2010 was Unheilig with the song "Unter deiner Flagge", representing North Rhine-Westphalia. In second place was Silly representing Saxony-Anhalt, and third place to Ich + Ich feat. Mohamed Mounir representing Berlin. Unheilig, and Silly formed a leading group from the start of voting, that lasted until the end, with the two bands being separated by 12 points, and over 50 points separating them from third place. Many of Silly's highest points came from the new states of Germany (including Berlin) from the former East Germany, due to the band's popularity, they also received the highest ever score for runner-up, earning more points than winning artists from 2006 to 2008.

9 of the 16 states awarded themselves the maximum of 12 points, with Baden-Württemberg, Berlin, Brandenburg, Hesse, Lower Saxony, Rhineland-Palatinate, and Saxony awarding themselves 10, 10, 8, 10, 4, 10, and 8 points respectively.

It is worth noting that the entry representing Lower Saxony, "So geht das jede Nacht," was in fact a cover of one of the first German entries at the Eurovision Song Contest. It was performed originally by Freddy Quinn as the second of Germany's two entries at the first-ever contest in 1956.

Results

Scoreboard

References

External links
 Official BSC website at tvtotal.de

2010
Bundesvision Song Contest
2010 song contests